Beijiao may refer to:

 Beijiao, Foshan (北滘镇), town in Shunde District, Foshan, Guangdong, China
 Beijiao, Zibo (北郊镇), town in Zhoucun District, Zibo, Shandong, China
 Beijiao (island) (北礁), one of the Paracel Islands in the South China Sea